Taeniotes orbignyi is a species of beetle in the family Cerambycidae. It was described by Félix Édouard Guérin-Méneville in 1844. It is known from Panama.

References

orbignyi
Beetles described in 1844
Taxa named by Félix Édouard Guérin-Méneville
Beetles of Central America